The Phoenix Tree is the third EP from Japanese post-rock band Mono. It was released in April 2007 through Temporary Residence Limited. It is part of a collection of EP's released by Temporary Residence Limited, Travels in Constants.

Track listing

References

2007 albums
Mono (Japanese band) albums